The Men's time trial T1-2 road cycling event at the 2016 Summer Paralympics took place on 14 September at Flamengo Park, Pontal. Eight riders from seven nations competed.

The T1 category and T2 category for tricycle classifications for cyclists with balance impairments. As a joined category, the times are factored to produce a final 'time'.

Results : Men's road time trial T1-2

References

Men's road time trial T1-2